James Biberi (born July 28, 1965, in Gjakova) is an Albanian-American actor.

In 2013, he starred as Ilir in the neo-noir crime thriller Dead Man Down.

Filmography

Film

Television

Videogames

References

External links

1965 births
Yugoslav emigrants to the United States
American male film actors
American people of Albanian descent
American male television actors
Living people